Wieseck may refer to:

 Wieseck (river), a river of Hesse, Germany
 Wieseck, a district of the town Giessen in Hesse, Germany